Hauerslevia is a fungal genus of uncertain familial placement (incertae sedis) in the order Auriculariales. The genus is monotypic, containing the single species Hauerslevia pulverulenta, known from Europe.

References

External links
 

Auriculariales
Fungi of Europe
Monotypic Basidiomycota genera